Avlonas (before 1927: Σάλεσι - Salesi) is a town and a former municipality in Attica, Greece. Since the 2011 local government reform it is part of the municipality Oropos, of which it is a municipal unit. The municipal unit has an area of 106.092 km2.

Geography

Avlonas is situated in the northwestern part of East Attica, at the northern edge of the Parnitha mountain range and 10 km south of the South Euboean Gulf coast. It is 30 km north of Athens city center. Motorway 1 (Athens - Thessaloniki) passes north of the town. Avlonas has a station on the railway from Athens to Thessaloniki. The municipal unit Avlonas also includes the village Asprochori (pop. 151). Avlonas has three pre-school facilities, one elementary school, one lyceum/middle school and one gymnasio/high school.

Name
Avlonas (Greek: Αυλώνας) is often called Avlona (Αυλώνα), however the masculine Avlonas should be used rather than the feminine Avlona. The ancient Greek Avlon (Αυλών) is also masculine. It appears that the name Αvlon is connected with the worship of Dionysus according to an ancient slab that was found in the area, dedicated to Διονύσῳ Αὐλωνεῖ (Dionysos of Avlon).

Historical population

Avlonas has historically been an Arvanite settlement.

References

External links
Official website of Avlonas' Municipality 
GTP Travel Pages (Municipality)
Avlonas Bicycling Tour in 1994
Schools in Avlonas
Zygomalas Museum

Populated places in East Attica
Oropos
Arvanite settlements